After completing a postgraduate degree, one of the options is to pursue a Doctor of Philosophy (Ph.D) program. These Ph.D programs cost money and time. To help a scholar there are many Research Fellowship Schemes in India funded by either a government agency or a private one. Such a scholar pursuing a Ph.D receives a monthly stipend and in some cases an annual contingency grant for 2 to 5 years.

The most relevant of these are:

Prime Minister’s Research Fellowship (PMRF) 
Jawaharlal Nehru Memorial Fund Scholarship
Physical Research Laboratory Junior Research Fellowship
Google PhD Fellowship India Program
ICHR Junior Research Fellowship (JRF)
ICSSR Doctoral Research Fellowship
Maulana Azad National Fellowship
NCERT Doctoral Fellowship for PhD
Junior Research Fellowship
CSIR-UGC JRF NET Fellowship
AICTE Doctoral fellowship (ADF)
DBT-JRF Fellowship
FITM – AYUSH Research Fellowship Scheme
SAARC Agricultural PhD Scholarship
Swami Vivekananda Single Child Scholarship for Research in Social Science
ESSO-NCESS Junior Research Fellowship

Prime Minister’s Research Fellowship (PMRF)

This fellowship was launched by the Ministry of Human Resource Development under the supervision of the Central Government of India  in the budget 2018-2019. This scholarship scheme provide financial support to the meritorious students of IISc and IIT going for a PhD. Under this scheme, the scholar gets a monthly stipend of ₹70,000 for first-year which is increased to ₹80,000 per month during 4th and 5th year of the program. During the course of the fellowship, researchers are also eligible to a research contingency grant of ₹2 lakh per annum.

Jawaharlal Nehru Memorial Fund Scholarship

Jawaharlal Nehru Memorial Fund Scholarships is another Ph.D scholarship available to Indian and students of Asian countries. The selected candidates are paid ₹18,000 every month to support their tution fees. Contingency grand of ₹15,000 is also paid to these researchers annually.

Physical Research Laboratory Junior Research Fellowship

It is one of the top PhD scholarships in India for postgraduates in the field of physics and astronomy. It is exclusively for PhD research at Physical Research Laboratory (PRL) and provides monthly awards up to ₹35,000 per month.

Google PhD Fellowship India Program

This fellowship program is offered by Google for  Ph.D scholars in computer science. The Google Ph.D Fellowship India Program also provides a monthly fellowship amount and a contingency expenses. Moreover the scholars are also provided an internship offer at Google.

ICHR Junior Research Fellowship

ICHR Junior Research Fellowship (JRF) are for PhD aspirants of historical studies and are offered by the Indian Council of Historical Research. It offers monthly stipend of ₹17,600 and contingency expenses of ₹16,500 for 2 years.

ICSSR Doctoral Research Fellowship

It is a doctoral fellowship given by Indian Council of Social Science Research of Government of India pursuing Ph.D in social sciences and is registered in a UGC recognized Indian university. The fellowship  is ₹20,000 per month for only two years.

Maulana Azad National Fellowship

This fellowship is provided by the Ministry of Minority Affairs of the Government of India. The fellowship is only provided to students from minority communities whose family income is not more than 6 Lakh. Financial assistance of ₹28,000 per month for 5 years is given to pursue higher education such as MPhil and PhD.

NCERT Doctoral Fellowship for Ph.D

This fellowship is given by NCERT to young scholars in any recognized university in India. The NET qualified NCERT doctoral fellows  receives ₹25,000 per month for a maximum period of three years. For the candidates who have not qualified for the NET exam, the amount is only ₹23,000 per month.

Junior Research Fellowship

The JRF or Junior Research Fellow is a letter awarded by the University Grants Commission (UGC) to the candidates who qualify in the National Eligibility Test.  JRF letter is a bearer document that signifies you can avail of the scholarship while pursuing M.Phil./Ph.D

Who gets JRF certification? 
If a candidate takes the UGC NET JRF Exam in a particular subject, then there are 2  cut-offs declared by UGC. One of them is for clearing NET and the other one which is a bit higher than NET is for JRF. The score of JRF is valid only for 3 years whereas the score of NET is valid for the lifetime.

CSIR-UGC JRF NET Fellowship

This is a fully-funded PhD scholarship offered by the Council of Scientific and Industrial Research (CSIR) for the field of Engineering, Mathematical Sciences, Life Sciences, Earth, Atmospheric, Ocean and Planetary Science, Chemical Sciences, amongst others. Similar to UGC JRF, the stipend of a JRF selected through CSIR- National Eligibility Test (NET) will be ₹31,000 per month for the first two years and ₹35,000 per month for the next three years. In addition, annual contingent grant of ₹20,000 is also provided.

AICTE Doctoral fellowship (ADF)

ADF or AICTE Doctoral Fellowship, is a research promotion scheme launched by AICTE in 2020. It is the AICTE equivalent to junior research fellowships. The objectives of the ADF scheme are:
To promote research culture in AICTE approved Institutions.
To promote collaborative research between Institute and Industries leading to start-ups.
To nurture talents for technical research.

In 2020 and 2021 as per  ADF Guidelines, 339 Nos. of fellowship were granted to 42 Universities in India for the academic year 2020-2021 and 2021 -2022. For the current academic year 20222-2023, fellowships was reduced to 310 Nos in only 35 Universities in India. The University-wise number of fellowship are available in ADF Scheme published Annually during the month of July by AICTE.

Fellowship

The fellowship of ADF Fellows is  ₹31,000 per month for the first two years followed by ₹35,000 per month for the third year. house rent allowance (HRA) is also provided to these scholars at the rate of 8%, 16% and 24% as per the Government of India (GoI) norms  In addition, Contingency Grant of Rs.15, 000/- per annum is also given to ADF Fellows to meet their miscellaneous expenditures.
Even in IIT's and NIT's the fellowship for doing Ph.D is same as UGC, which is Rs 31,000 per month. The highest fellowship for doing Ph.D in India is PMRF- Prime Ministers Research Fellowship. The fellowship for ADF  is the only fellowship that includes house rent allowance (HRA), so its the second highest Ph.D Fellowship in India, behind only PMRF- Prime Ministers Research Fellowship. But this fellowship is only available for 3 years whereas other Ph.D fellowships are for 5 years.

List of Universities in India under ADF Scheme

 Jawaharlal Nehru Technological University, Anantapur , Andhra Pradesh - 8 Fellowship
 North Eastern Regional Institute of Science and Technology (Deemed to be University) , Arunachal Pradesh - 8 Fellowship
 Assam Science and Technology University, Guwahati , Assam - 5 Fellowship
 Tezpur University, Tezpur , Assam - 11 Fellowship
 Chhattisgarh Swami Vivekanand Technical University, Bhillai , Chhattisgarh - 10 Fellowship
 Guru Ghasidas Vishwavidyalaya, Bilaspur (Chhatisgarh) , Chhattisgarh - 8 Fellowship
 Delhi Technological University, Delhi (Delhi) , Delhi - 8 Fellowship
 Guru Gobind Singh Indraprastha University, New Delhi , Delhi - 5 Fellowship
 Indraprastha Institute of Information Technology, (IIIT) Delhi , Delhi - 8 Fellowship
 Jamia Millia Islamia, Central University, New Delhi (Delhi) , Delhi - 8 Fellowship
 Jawaharlal Nehru University (JNU), New Delhi , Delhi - 8 Fellowship
 Gujarat Technological University, Gujarat , Gujarat - 15 Fellowship
 Guru Jambheshwar University of Science and Technology, Hisar , Haryana - 6 Fellowship
 J. C. Bose University of Science and Technology (YMCA), Faridabad , Haryana - 7 Fellowship
 Deenbandhu Chhotu Ram University of Science and Technology, Murthal , Haryana - 7 Fellowship
 Jharkhand University of Technology, Ranchi , Jharkhand - 5 Fellowship
 Visvesvaraya Technological University (VTU), Belagavi , Karnataka - 10 Fellowship
 APJ Abdul Kalam Technological University, Thiruvananthapuram , Kerala - 10 Fellowship
 Rajiv Gandhi Proudyogiki Vishwavidyalaya, Bhopal , Madhya Pradesh - 10 Fellowship
 Mumbai University, Mumbai , Maharashtra - 6 Fellowship
 Shivaji University, Kolhapur , Maharashtra - 9 Fellowship
 Savitribai Phule Pune University, formerly University of Pune , Maharashtra - 8 Fellowship
 Institute of Chemical Technology, Mumbai , Maharashtra - 11 Fellowship
 Biju Patnaik University of Technology, Rourkela , Odisha - 10 Fellowship
 Veer Surendra Sai University of Technology, Burla , Odisha - 8 Fellowship
 Puducherry Technological University, Puducherry , Puducherry - 3 Fellowship
 Maharaja Ranjit Singh Punjab Technical University, Bhatinda , Punjab - 5 Fellowship
 Sant Longowal Institute of Engg and Technology (Deemed University) , Punjab - 8 Fellowship
 Anna University, Chennai , Tamil Nadu - 15 Fellowship
 Jawaharlal Nehru Technological University, Hyderabad , Telengana - 10 Fellowship
 University of Hyderabad, Hyderabad (Telangana) , Telengana - 8 Fellowship
 Tripura University (Central University) , Tripura - 8 Fellowship
 Dr. A. P.J. Abdul Kalam Technical University, Lucknow , Uttar Pradesh - 18 Fellowship
 Maulana Abul Kalam Azad University of Technology, Kolkata , West Bengal - 10 Fellowship
 Jadavpur University, Kolkata , West Bengal - 16 Fellowship

DBT-JRF Fellowship

This Fellowship is offered by the Government of India for biotechnology scholars who clear clear the biotechnology eligibility test (BET). The fellowship amount of is ₹25,000 per month for the first two years and ₹28,000 for the last three years. In addition house rent allowance (HRA) is also given.

FITM – AYUSH Research Fellowships Scheme

This fellowship is awarded to scholars of age 28 – 35 doing research in the field of AYUSH. Under this scheme, a doctoral fellowship for 2 years and a postdoctoral fellowship for 1 year is provided.

SAARC Agricultural PhD Scholarship

This fellowship is provided by SAARC for pursuing a Ph.D in animal nutrition or fish nutrition and feed technology for period of 3 years.

Swami Vivekananda Single Child Scholarship for Research in Social Science

This scholarship is for a single woman pursuing a Ph.D in social sciences in an UGC approved institute/university.

ESSO-NCESS Junior Research Fellowship

This fellowship is for scholars who has passed CSIR-UGC NET exam for JRF and pursuing a Ph.D in  areas of earth system sciences.

References 

Research in India
Scholarships in India